Symposium: Canadian Journal of Continental Philosophy is a semi-annual peer-reviewed academic journal covering different areas of continental philosophy published by Canadian Society for Continental Philosophy. It was established in 1997 and publishes contributions in English and French.

Symposium Book Award
Symposium grants an annual book award. Books submitted for this award are assessed by Symposium editorial team and the CSCP executive. Recipients have included:
Steven Crowell
Lisa Guenther
Espen Hammer
Sean D. Kirkland
Anthony Steinbock

See also 
 List of philosophy journals

References

External links 
 

Biannual journals
Multilingual journals
Publications established in 1997
1997 establishments in Canada
Philosophy journals
Continental philosophy literature
Philosophy Documentation Center academic journals
Academic journals published by learned and professional societies of Canada